Park Han-byeol (born 28 September 1997) is a South Korean swimmer. She competed in the women's 50 metre backstroke event at the 2017 World Aquatics Championships.

References

External links
 

1997 births
Living people
South Korean female backstroke swimmers
Place of birth missing (living people)
Swimmers at the 2014 Asian Games
Swimmers at the 2018 Asian Games
Asian Games competitors for South Korea
21st-century South Korean women